Butwal Solar PV Project is located at Rupandehi District of Lumbini Province, Nepal.  The plant is owned and run by Ridi Hydropower Development Company Ltd, an IPP. The plant came in operation in October 2020.

The power station has capacity of 8.5 MW consisting of 32,640 number of solar panels - each generating about 330 watts peak power. The plant occupies an area of about 26 Bighas of land (approx. 17.2 hector). The energy generated by the project is connected to the 33 kV Butwal Substation in Tilottama. The solar station generates energy only during the daytime.

The plant was built in 10 months at the cost of NPR 65.5 crores. The loan is financed by Bank of Kathmandu along with Citizens Bank and Nepal Bangladesh Bank. The electricity is sold to Nepal Electricity Authority at rate of NPR 7.3/unit for 25 years. After 25 years, the ownership will be transferred to the Nepal government.

See also
List of power stations in Nepal
Nuwakot Solar Power Station
Mithila 2 Solar PV Station

References

Energy in Nepal
Renewable energy in Nepal
Solar power in Nepal
Solar power stations in Nepal
Electric power in Nepal
2020 establishments in Nepal
Buildings and structures in Rupandehi District